Ryan Fessler (born March 8, 2001) is an American professional soccer player who plays for Sporting Kansas City II in the USL Championship via the Sporting Kansas City Academy.

Career
Fessler began with the Charlotte Soccer Academy, before moving to Sporting Kansas City in 2016. During his time with Sporting KC's academy, Fessler made 65 appearances for the U-17 and U-19 squads, tallying 12 goals. In 2018, Fessler signed an academy contract with Sporting Kansas City II (then named Swope Park Rangers), but didn't make an appearance.

Fessler committed to playing college soccer at Wake Forest University in 2019, but opted to remain with Sporting Kansas City instead.

On July 2, 2020, Fessler signed another USL academy contract with USL Championship side Sporting Kansas City II. He made his debut on August 5, 2020, appearing as an 87th-minute substitute during a 1–1 draw with Saint Louis FC.

References

External links 
 Sporting KC profile
 Wake Forest profile
 

2001 births
Living people
American soccer players
Sporting Kansas City II players
Association football midfielders
People from Charlotte, North Carolina
Soccer players from North Carolina
USL Championship players
Wake Forest Demon Deacons men's soccer players